is a Japanese artistic gymnast. He is the 2018 and 2019 Japanese National All Around Champion. His older brother, Wataru Tanigawa, is also an international gymnast.

In 2018, he won the silver medal in the men's team event at the 2018 Asian Games in Jakarta, Indonesia. In the same year, he also won the bronze medal in the men's team event at the 2018 World Artistic Gymnastics Championships held in Doha, Qatar. A year later, he also won the bronze medal in the men's team event at the 2019 World Artistic Gymnastics Championships held in Stuttgart, Germany.

In 2014, he won several medals in the men's junior events at the 2014 Pacific Rim Gymnastics Championships held in Richmond, British Columbia.

In 2019, he won the gold medal in the men's team event at the 2019 Summer Universiade in Naples, Italy. He also won the bronze medal in the floor event, and the gold medal on parallel bars.

References

External links
 

Living people
1999 births
Place of birth missing (living people)
Japanese male artistic gymnasts
Gymnasts at the 2018 Asian Games
Medalists at the 2018 Asian Games
Asian Games silver medalists for Japan
Asian Games medalists in gymnastics
Universiade medalists in gymnastics
Universiade gold medalists for Japan
Universiade bronze medalists for Japan
Medalists at the 2019 Summer Universiade
21st-century Japanese people